Jonkheer Karel Pieter Antoni Jan Hubertus (Carel) Godin de Beaufort (10 April 1934 – 2 August 1964) was a Dutch nobleman and motorsport driver from the Netherlands.

Career
Godin de Beaufort participated in 31 World Championship Grands Prix, becoming the first Dutchman ever to score points in the Formula One World Championship, and numerous non-Championship Formula One races. He was one of the last truly amateur drivers in F1, and ran his own cars – painted the vibrant Dutch racing colour: orange – under the Ecurie Maarsbergen banner, the team taking its name from de Beaufort's country estate. In early years he was considered something of a mobile chicane, and a danger to other drivers on the track. However, in later years he matured into a competent and popular competitor.

Always a Porsche devotee (he only drove two World Championship races in anything else) he was a familiar sight at both Championship and non-Championship races in his orange Porsche 718, bought from the Rob Walker Racing Team. Although the 718 was outclassed even in its first year with him, he persisted with it as it was the only design into which he could fit his burly frame. The size of the car, and a streak of self-deprecating humour in de Beaufort himself, earned it the nickname "Fatty Porsche". With stereotypical aristocratic eccentricity he often drove without shoes, and at his final race in Germany was even seen taking practice laps wearing a Beatles wig, rather than his helmet.

Death
Godin de Beaufort was driving the Porsche 718 in practice for the 1964 German Grand Prix at the Nürburgring when the car suddenly veered off the track at the infamous Bergwerk corner.  He was thrown out and suffered massive injuries to his head, chest and legs.  Initially De Beaufort was taken to a hospital in Koblenz, but on the following day he was transferred to a major neurological centre in Cologne where he died in the evening.

Racing record

Complete 24 Hours of Le Mans results

Complete Formula One World Championship results
(key)

Notes
 – Formula 2 entry.

Complete Formula One Non-Championship results
(key) (Races in bold indicate pole position)
(Races in italics indicate fastest lap)

References

1934 births
1964 deaths
24 Hours of Le Mans drivers
Dutch Formula One drivers
Ecurie Maarsbergen Formula One drivers
Dutch nobility
Dutch racing drivers
People from Maarn
Racing drivers who died while racing
Sport deaths in Germany
World Sportscar Championship drivers
Formula One team owners
Formula One team principals
Sportspeople from Utrecht (province)
Porsche Motorsports drivers